Knoxville High School may refer to:

 Knoxville High School (Illinois), United States
 Knoxville High School (Iowa), United States
 Knoxville High School (Tennessee), United States